Chandirani is a 1953 Indian swashbuckler film directed by Bhanumathi and produced by P. S. Ramakrishna Rao under the Bharani Studios banner. The film is shot simultaneously in Telugu, Tamil, and Hindi languages. It stars Bhanumathi, N. T. Rama Rao, S. V. Ranga Rao and Relangi. Bhanumathi also wrote the story while Ramakrishna Rao scripted the film. The film's music composed is C. R. Subburaman & M. S. Viswanathan.

Plot
King Veerasimha was attracted towards a court dancer during his birthday celebrations. She delivers twin girls after their union. The Senani, (major) Prachandudu, who also likes her, kills the dancer and imprisons the King. The minister saves one of the twins and sends her to the forest. Knowing this, Prachandudu kills him and takes charge of the kingdom. The other twin stays in the kingdom. Champarani in the kingdom, and Chandirani in the forest, grow up as two different personalities. The son of the minister Kishore  and Champarani love each other. Mukund is the son of Prachandudu. Kishore goes to the forest and learns about Chandirani, and that she loves him. With the help of Mukund, Chandirani enters the fort and meets her father. She learns about the love between Champarani and Kishore. Meanwhile, Prachandudu arrests Kishore. Chandirani attacks the kingdom with the help of the people. During the conflict, Chandirani sacrifices her life eliminating Prachandudu, before dying she unites Champarani and Kishore.

Cast
Bhanumathi  as Chandi / Champa (double role)
N. T. Rama Rao as Kishore 
S. V. Ranga Rao as Prachandudu
C.S.R
Relangi as Mukunda (Agha in Hindi)
Amarnath as Maharaja Veerasimha
R. Nageswara Rao as Marthand
Hemalatha as an old woman
Kumari Tulasi as a peasant girl 
Angamuthu as a maid
Doraswamy as Ramsingh

Soundtrack
The music was composed by C. R. Subburaman and M. S. Viswanathan.

Telugu songs
Lyrics by Samudrala Sr.

Tamil songs
Lyrics were by K. D. Santhanam. The song "Vaan Meedhile Inba Then Maari Peiyudhe" is set in the Carnatic music raga 'Pahaadi'.

Hindi songs
Lyrics by Vishwamitra Adil.

Critical reception
M. L. Narasimham of The Hindu wrote, "Though there is nothing new in the story, the novelty lies in the manner it is narrated. Chandi's sword fight and the fight sequences with the tiger, the exchange of places by the siblings, went well with the audience."
 
The film was a profitable venture. As of 2013, Chandirani held the record of being the only film to be released in three languages on the same day (28 August 1953). Bhanumathi also became the first woman director to write and direct a film that achieved this feat.

References

External links
 
 
 
 Naati 101 Chitralu (Telugu hit films released between 1931 and 1965), S. V. Rama Rao, Kinnera Publications, Hyderabad, 2006, pages: 75–6.

1953 films
1950s Telugu-language films
1950s Hindi-language films
Indian black-and-white films
Indian multilingual films
1950s Tamil-language films
Films scored by Viswanathan–Ramamoorthy
Films scored by C. R. Subbaraman
1950s multilingual films